The Pacific Northwest Regional Observatory is an astronomical observatory at the Wallula Gap in the Horse Heaven Hills, near the Columbia River in Southeast Washington. The main instrument, an 0.8 meter Cassegrain reflecting optical telescope, was formerly located at Rattlesnake Mountain above Richland, Washington, where it was installed in 1971 by Battelle, dismantled in 2009, and restored at Columbia Basin College in Richland  2010–2011. Construction of the observatory at Braden Research Farm, owned by Whitman College, broke ground in 2011, and the telescope mirror was placed there in November 2012.

, the main instrument, then at Rattlesnake Mountain, was "the largest, most powerful, optical research-grade telescope in Washington State".

See also
 List of observatories

References

Sources

External links

2012 establishments in Washington (state)
Astronomical observatories in Washington (state)
Buildings and structures in Walla Walla County, Washington
Horse Heaven Hills
Whitman College